Judith Margaret Parr (née Grant) is a New Zealand educational psychology academic. She is a full professor at the University of Auckland.

Academic career

After a secondary education at Matamata College (where her father was a teacher) and an undergraduate at the University of Auckland, Parr did a 1989 PhD at Australian National University titled "Revision in writing: cognitive and linguistic aspects". She then returned to Auckland and became a full professor in 2011.

Parr's research interests centre on literacy, particularly writing and has led to the publication of many documents for the Ministry of Education.

Selected works 
 Griffiths, Carol, and Judy M. Parr. "Language-learning strategies: Theory and perception." ELT journal 55, no. 3 (2001): 247–254.
 Parr, Judy M., and Helen S. Timperley. "Feedback to writing, assessment for teaching and learning and student progress." Assessing writing 15, no. 2 (2010): 68–85.
 Ward, Lorrae, and Judy M. Parr. "Revisiting and reframing use: Implications for the integration of ICT." Computers & Education 54, no. 1 (2010): 113–122.
 Parr, Judy M. "Extending educational computing: A case of extensive teacher development and support." Journal of Research on Computing in Education 31, no. 3 (1999): 280–291.
 Parr, Judy M., and Irene YY Fung. A review of the literature on computer-assisted learning, particularly integrated learning systems, and outcomes with respect to literacy and numeracy. Auckland Uniservices, University of Auckland, 2000.

References

External links
 
 

Living people
Year of birth missing (living people)
New Zealand women academics
Australian National University alumni
University of Auckland alumni
Academic staff of the University of Auckland
New Zealand educational theorists
New Zealand psychologists
New Zealand women psychologists
People educated at Matamata College